Stany may refer to the following places:
Stany, Lubusz Voivodeship (west Poland)
Stany, Silesian Voivodeship (south Poland)
Stany, Subcarpathian Voivodeship (south-east Poland)